Mossley Hockey Club is a field hockey club based in the village of Mossley in Newtownabbey, County Antrim. It was formed in 1929 following a meeting of employees of Henry Campbell’s Mill in the village. The club currently fields five men's teams, with the first team playing in the Premier League of the Ulster Senior League. In 1994 the Club won a coaching award in recognition of its work with young players.

Early years

During the 1930s the Club enjoyed great success in the Intermediate and Junior League. In 1942 the first team won through to the Irish Junior Cup, but were on the receiving end of a 4-0 defeat by Pembroke Wanderers II. Two years later fortunes were reversed when Mossley won the Irish Junior Cup for the first time with a 3-0 win over Graiguenamanagh.

The First XI were promoted to Qualifying League B and Senior status was attained when that section was won in 1951.

1950s and 1960s

The first Senior trophy final was in the Kirk Cup in 1953-54, when defeat was suffered at the hands of Lisnagarvey by 2 goals to one after extra time.

The First XI were beaten in the Ulster Final of the Irish Senior Cup in 1964-65 by Portrush.

In 1966 the Second team won the Irish Junior Cup with a 4-0 win over the Catholic Institute II, Limerick.

The Anderson Cup was won by the First XI in 1966-67 and the following season promotion was gained to the top section of the Ulster Senior League. This position would be held until the end of 2002-03.

1970s and 1980s

In 1973 Mossley made a second appearance in the Kirk Cup Final, losing to Lisnagarvey after a replay. In 1983, a third Kirk Cup Final appearance, again against Lisnagarvey was won 2-0.

The Second XI were successful in the 1986 Irish Junior Cup defeating Banbridge Second XI in the Final. The team was captained by David McKinstry, who was also a member of the 1966 Cup winning team.

Grounds

The original grass pitches at Mossley were abandoned in 1976 and the Club played home games at the City of Belfast Playing Fields at Mallusk. The present site at The Glade was purchased in 1984, and in 1991 the Club installed a synthetic surface. In 2004 the original artificial surface was replaced with a water based pitch.

Notable players

Men's internationals

In 1952 Bryan Gilroy the became the first Mossley player to represent Ireland.

 Harold Burns Jnr 
 Paul Cooke 
 Bryan Gilroy
 David Gordon 
 John Jackson
 Richard Willis
 Simon Todd

Honours

Kirk Cup (1) 1983-84
Anderson Cup 1966-67, 1988–89, 2013-2014
Irish Junior Cup (3) 1943-44, 1965–66, 1985–86

Sources

External links
Mossley Hockey Club

Field hockey clubs in Northern Ireland
Sports clubs in County Antrim
Field hockey clubs established in 1929
1929 establishments in Northern Ireland
Newtownabbey